This is a general glossary of the terms used in the sport of gymnastics.

A 

AA Abbreviation for all-around.
AB A scoring abbreviation for uneven bars, from the name asymmetric bars.
A-score Under the current Code of Points, this score tallies the gymnast' counted skills, combinations and EGR. In theory, the A-score can be open-ended, depending on the skills the gymnast presents.
Acrobatic gymnastics A discipline of gymnastics where partners work together to combine the tumbling and power of the floor exercise in artistic gymnastics with the flexibility and artistry of dance. Acrobatic gymnastics routines are performed on the floor apparatus.
 A term in which a singular athlete competes (and scored in) on all four (women) or six (men) apparatus in a single continuous meet. This can be qualified individually as part of, or simultaneously during, a team competition, and/or in a completely separate singular continuous event termed 'Individual All-Around Finals'. 

Arabian Type of salto that starts out with a backward entry into a half twist that begins immediately after takeoff, and then continues into a front flip.
Apparatus Specific equipment used in gymnastics.
Artistic gymnastics A discipline of gymnastics in which competitors perform upon apparatuses.
Arabesque Standing on one leg with the other leg raised about 45 degrees
Aerial
A type of cartwheel where a gymnast's hands do not touch the ground.
Aerial twist an acrobatic flip that incorporates a 180° rotation during the peak of the flip's height.

B 
Backhandspring: a skill in which you jump reach for the floor and kick over with you legs together at all times 

B-score Under the current Code of Points, this score rates the gymnast's execution, form, artistry and technique. The judges take their deductions from the 10.0 base score.
Back-to-back tumbling A series of skills in which the gymnast executes a tumbling pass from one corner of the mat to the other, rebounds, and performs another tumbling pass in the other direction without stopping. Notably performed by Oksana Omelianchik (URS), Daniela Silivaș (ROU) and Dominique Dawes (USA).
Balance One of the three routines in acrobatic gymnastics, highlighted by static hold positions that demonstrate strength, agility and flexibility.
Balance beam A gymnastics apparatus used by women in artistic gymnastics. It is a  platform upon which gymnasts perform tumbling and dance skills.
Ball A gymnastics apparatus used in rhythmic gymnastics. The ball rests in the gymnast's hands, is balanced on the body, and is thrown into the air and caught.
Banned skills Prohibited gymnastic moves due to high risk of injuries for the performing athlete.
Base  In acrobatic gymnastics, the role in pair and group competition that requires strength and balance. The base is usually an older, larger athlete.
BB The scoring abbreviation for balance beam.
Bib The number worn on the gymnast's back, and used in the scoring and roster sheets, to identify them to the judges.

Busnari Reverse Stöckli straddle through handstand. Named after Alberto Busnari.
B turn  Backtuck

C 
ChestrollThis skill to bend the back. It is also called a chin stand.
Cartwheel The maneuver where one moves sideways, from hands to feet, in a straight line (in the motion that the wheel of a cart would follow), while keeping the back, arms, and legs straight, and the feet pointed.

Chalk Carbonate of magnesia, used by gymnasts on their hands, feet and apparatus to make the surface of the equipment less slippery, or to mark lines on the mats.
Circle A full circle with the legs together and both hands supporting the gymnast. One of the three basic swings on the Pommel Horse.
Clubs A gymnastics apparatus used in rhythmic gymnastics.
Code of Points The document that regulates scoring of each discipline.
Combined Presented only during acrobatic gymnastics finals, the Combined routine features the elements of both the Balance and the Dynamic (Tempo) routines.
Competition Performance in front of a judge which the judge will then score and give points.

D 
Derwael-Fenton release move on uneven bars: backward Stalder with counter straddle reverse hecht over the high bar with half (180 degree) turn to hang in mixed L-grip, introduced by Belgian gymnast Nina Derwael and British gymnast Georgia-Mae Fenton
Diamidov Swing forward with 1/1 (360°) turn on one arm to handstand on parallel bars. Named after Sergey Diomidov.
Dismount The act of getting off an apparatus and the skill used to do it.
Dynamic One of the three routines in acrobatic gymnastics, combining choreography with tumbling sequences and flight elements like throws.
Dive Roll Transitioning from handstand into forward roll.

E 
EGR Abbreviation for element group requirements.
Element group requirements Under the current Code of Points, the specific required skills, or skill families, a gymnast must show at some point in their routine on each event. For instance, on uneven bars, one of the EGRs is a release move. Currently, five EGR skills are required on every event.
Elite The highest competitive level in gymnastics, or a gymnast who competes at the highest level. The term is used in the US, Australia, and some other nations, but is not universal.
Elementary gymnastics The type of gymnastics that older gymnasts in training use. It helps them to understand the elements and way of gymnastics.
Elbow stand An inverted pose in which the body is supported on only forearms.

F 

Fédération Internationale de Gymnastique The international sports governing body for gymnastics. Its name is commonly abbreviated as "FIG".
Flight series On balance beam, a series of acrobatic skills performed in combination from one end of the beam to the other.
Flip A move where the gymnast will jump from a handstand;forwards or backward landing facing the same direction
Floor A gymnastics apparatus used by men and women in artistic gymnastics. The event performed upon this apparatus is known as Floor Exercise.
Floor exercise The event performed on the floor apparatus. Men and women perform choreographed routines that include tumbling and acrobatic skills.
Freestyle gymnastics A fusion of traditional gymnastic and acrobatic tricks, with kicks and leaps inspired by martial arts, parkour and free running. It captures the power and explosive nature of freestyle activities in sport and brings them indoors, performed on a range of purpose built equipment with associated training techniques.
Front handspring
A gymnastics move in which the gymnast takes a running start, then places their hands as if a handstand. They kick one leg over, push off the ground, and come back up.
Front tuck The act of running, jumping off of 2 feet, turning in mid-air, and landing on the ground on two feet.
FX The scoring abbreviation for floor exercise.
Full A flip that turns fully in mid air.

G 
Gainer A gymnastics skill in which a gymnast performs a backwards flip while moving forward.
Grip See hand guard.
Gymnastics A sport involving performance of exercises requiring physical strength, agility and coordination. It evolved from exercises used by the ancient Greeks, including skills for mounting and dismounting a horse, and circus eating skills
Giant When casting into a handstand position and making a full rotation around the bar while the body is kept in a straight line.
Good leg split A split with the gymnast's stronger leg forward.

H 
Hand guard A glove or wrist strap worn by gymnasts to protect the skin on their hands when they perform upon apparatuses.
Hanging position Initial position of the gymnasts before the exercise. Only on still rings and horizontal bar, the gymnast is guaranteed the right to be assisted to the hanging position by a coach or gymnast.
HB The scoring abbreviation for horizontal (or high) bar.
High bar See horizontal bar.
Hit To perform a routine or skill to the best of one's ability, with no major errors or deductions. Example: "He hit the dismount.": May also be used as an adjective to describe a routine performed well.
Hoop A gymnastics apparatus used in rhythmic gymnastics. It is a hollow hoop with an interior diameter of 80 to 90 cm.
Horizontal bar A gymnastics apparatus used by men in artistic gymnasts. It consists of one 2.4m bar upon which gymnasts perform skills. It is also known as high bar.
Handstand To stand inverted straight up with squeezed vertical body tension, with hands as a base support on floor.

I 
Indian clubs A type of exercise equipment used to present resistance in movement to develop strength and mobility, originated in the Indian subcontinent.
Illusion A challenging move that is performed by spinning on one foot with the chest at the ground.

J 
Junior A world-class/elite gymnast who is too young to compete as a senior, usually between the ages of 13 and 15.
Judges Trained professionals who judge gymnasts on their skills on each apparatus.
Jumps A straight, tucked, piked, straddle or split jump

K 
Kip  A basic skill in artistic gymnastics on the uneven bars that is used at a way of getting on the bar in a front support position or a handstand from a hanging or standing position.
Kip A training skill in trampolining.
Kolman A full-twisting Kovacs with two back somersaults and one full twist over the bar, after Alojz Kolman (Slovenia).
Kolyvanov From side support on end – flair or circle to handstand and travel 3/3 with 5/4 (450°) or more turn. Named after Alexander Kolyvanov.
Kovacs Double salto backward over the bar. Named after Péter Kovács (see article for execution).

L 

Layout A position in which the gymnast's body is completely stretched, toes pointed and legs straight. A layout in tumbling, vault, or balance beam is a salto performed in this position. In some countries, layout saltos are referred to as "straights" (e.g., "he performed a double straight").
Leotard A piece of clothing that comes in a variety of colors, shapes and sizes, and is used for gymnastics workouts and competitions.
L-sit

M 
Manna A strength move pressing with the hands where the legs and hips are raised until the hips are above the shoulders and the legs are parallel to the floor. (photos)
Master of Sport The term used to refer to a gymnast competing at the highest level of the sport in the USSR. Still used in Russia and other former Soviet republics.
Mat Safety equipment used in gymnastics to break falls.
Meet A commonly used term for a gymnastics competition.
Middle  In acrobatic gymnastics, the role in group competition that requires a combination of strength, balance, flexibility and power.
Mount The act of getting onto an apparatus and the skill used to do it.

N 
Neutral deduction A score deduction which is taken as a penalty for violations of rules not related directly to the gymnasts' performance, for instance, failure to adhere to required standards of competition attire. Neutral deductions may be applied against a team's cumulative score as well as against individual gymnasts.
Number See bib.
Needle To put two hands on the floor and one leg on the floor, then kick the other leg into a full split.
No handed forward roll very self explanatory

O 
OOB Abbreviation for out of bounds.
Out of bounds Situation on floor exercise or Vault (gymnastics) when a gymnast crosses the line indicating the border of the mat, resulting in a score deduction.
Onodi A backhandspring with a half turn mid air, in which a gymnast finishes with a front walkover.
One-handed cartwheel A regular cartwheel is performed, but one hand is placed and kept behind the back.

P 
Parallel bars A gymnastics apparatus used by men in artistic gymnastics. It consists of two 3.5m bars.
PB The scoring abbreviation for the parallel bars.
PH The scoring abbreviation for the pommel horse.
Pike a position where the body is bent only in the hips.
Pommel horse A gymnastics apparatus used by men in artistic gymnastics. It consists of a rectangular body and two pommels.
Posture Movement of the body
Pullover A move on bars in which the gymnast starts off the bar, then uses their arm strength to pull themself up and over the bar.
Press hand stand The gymnasts starts on the floor in a straddle, then pushes all their body weight onto their hands and presses into a handstand.

R 

Release move or release Skill on the uneven bars, parallel bars or high bar in which the gymnast lets go of the apparatus, performs a skill in the air, and regrasps the bar.
Ribbon A gymnastics apparatus used in rhythmic gymnastics. The ribbon is a long piece of material attached to a stick.
Rings See still rings.
Roundoff
A move similar to a cartwheel where the gymnast pushes off the ground and lands on two feet, facing the direction in which the move was initiated in. This move is often used to initiate a tumble.
Roll A roll is a rotation over an axis in the body over a surface.
Rope A gymnastics apparatus used in rhythmic gymnastics. It is made of a material that retains the qualities of lightness and suppleness. It is knotted at the end.
Rhythmic gymnastics A discipline of gymnastics in which competitors manipulate apparatuses. The sport combines elements of ballet, gymnastics, theatrical dance, and apparatus manipulation. Athletes are scored on their leaps, balances, pivots, flexibility, apparatus handling, and artistic effect.

S 
Salto A somersault.
Score protest A written complaint, submitted by the gymnast or their coaches or federation, to request reconsideration and possible revision of scores felt to be incorrect or unfair. Under FIG rules, protests must be filed immediately after the original score is reported, and before the end of the competition.
Senior A world-class/elite gymnast who is at least 16, or will be turning 16, within the calendar year.
Somersault A gymnastics maneuver in which a person rotates around the somersault axis, moving the feet over the head.
Specialist A gymnast who is especially strong on one or two events. A specialist often competes only on their specific events.
Springboard Gymnastics equipment required on vault, and used as an optional aid for mounts on parallel bars, balance beam and uneven bars.
SR The scoring abbreviation for the still rings.
Start value Under the pre-2006 Code of Points, the maximum score a gymnast could receive for a routine, after taking into consideration all bonus skills, combinations and fulfillment of required elements. The score was determined by subtracting deductions from the start value.
Stick To land an acrobatic skill, jump, or dismount perfectly, without any steps, stumbles or errors.
Still rings A gymnastics apparatus used by men in artistic gymnastics. It consists of two swinging hollow rings suspended by a frame.
Straddle A sitting position with the legs wide. It can also be performed at height.
Stuck landing A perfect landing, without any steps, stumbles or errors.
SV Abbreviation for start value.
Splits You go to the ground with one leg in front of you and one behind you

T 

Team final, or TF A team of 6 gymnasts (or 5 gymnasts at the 2012 London Olympics), representing a country, for the team competition.
Tkatchev Swing forward and vault backward piked to hang. Named after Aleksandr Tkachyov.
Toe shoes Shoes commonly worn by rhythmic gymnasts to perform turns.
Top In acrobatic gymnastics, the role in pair and group competition that emphasizes flexibility and agility. The top is usually a younger, smaller athlete.
Tsukahara A vault and family of vaults. The vault consists of a half turn off the springboard onto the vault table, then a push backwards, usually into a back salto or layout. Any vault that has a handspring with ¼ – ½ turn onto the vault table into a salto backwards is classified as a Tsukahara vault.  It is named after Mitsuo Tsukahara.
Tumbling The acrobatic skills performed on floor exercise and balance beam, such as back handsprings and saltos. Also, a specific discipline of gymnastics, performed on a 25-meter-long dynamic track, in which participants perform tumbling skills.
Tumbling run, or tumbling pass A series of acrobatic skills performed on floor from one corner of the mat to the other, typically beginning with a run and hurtle and ending with a major salto.
Tuck A jump with knees to chest.
Twist A layout with axial body rotation in addition to the fundamental rotation about the waist

V 

Vault A gymnastics apparatus used by both men and women in artistic gymnastics, or the skills performed upon it.
Voronin Back uprise and piked vault with 1/2 (180°) turn to hang. Named after Mikhail Voronin.
VT The scoring abbreviation for "vault".

W 

Warm-up The period and techniques that aim to warm up the gymnasts muscles in order for them not to injure themselves while stretching or training.
Waterfall 
Go in to a handstand then tuck your chin and  arch your back

Y 
Yurchenko loop A balance beam skill in which the gymnasts stands sideways on the beam, dives backwards into a back handspring (the "loop"), grasps the beam, performs a back hip circle and ends up in a front support position, resting on the hands. It is named after Natalia Yurchenko.
Yurchenko vault A vault and a family of vaults. It consists of a round-off onto the springboard and a back handspring onto the horse or vaulting table, followed by a salto. Any vault with a roundoff-back handspring entry is classified as a "Yurchenko-style" vault. It is named after Natalia Yurchenko.

References 

Gymnastics terms
Gymnastics
Gymnastics-related lists
Wikipedia glossaries using description lists